The 1990 NCAA basketball tournament was the 66th season in the Philippine National Collegiate Athletic Association (NCAA). The season started on August 5 at the Ninoy Aquino Stadium and ended with the Mapua Cardinals breaking the 16-year cycle and won the seniors crown, dethroning the defending champion San Sebastian Stags.

Seniors' tournament

Elimination round
Format:
Tournament divided into two halves: winners of the two halves dispute the championship in a best-of-3 finals series unless:
A team wins both rounds. In that case, the winning team automatically wins the championship.
A third team has a better cumulative record than both finalists. In that case, the third team has to win in a playoff against the team that won the second round to face the team that won in the first round in a best-of-3 finals series.

First round team standings
Season host is boldfaced.

Second round team standings
Season host is boldfaced.

Notes: Results of the first round match between San Beda and Perpetual Help and the San Beda vs Jose Rizal College are not yet found

Defending champion San Sebastian, Letran and Mapua ended the first round with identical 4-win, 1-loss card. The Cardinals nip the SSC Stags, 98-97, in the first of the two playoffs to determined the winner of the first round flag. Mapua clinch the first round championship by exacting revenge over Letran, 111-105 on September 4. The Knights gave the Cardinals their only loss in the first round via a 95-72 victory on opening day.

Mapua Cardinals was on a verge of a two-round sweep and an outright title after scoring four straight victories in the second round. They lost to fellow unbeaten San Sebastian Stags, 84-92, in their final outing. The Stags captured the second round championship by completing a five-game sweep, thus arranging a best-of-three title playoffs with the Cardinals.

Finals

Game 1

Game 2

Juniors' tournament

Second round team standings

Letran Squires completed a two-round sweep in winning back the Junior title they last held in 1985. The Squires were first round winner when JRC Light Bombers were stripped of the pennant for fielding an ineligible player.

See also
UAAP Season 53 men's basketball tournament

References

66
1990 in Philippine basketball